Pellenes luculentus is a jumping spider species in the genus Pellenes that lives in the Yemen. The female was first described in 2007.

References

Salticidae
Spiders of Asia
Spiders described in 2007
Taxa named by Wanda Wesołowska